Davy Hill is a town in the north of the Caribbean island of Montserrat, located close to the west coast near the narrowest point of the island on a saddle between the main bulk of the island's Centre Hills, and the peak of Silver Hill close to the island's northern tip. 

Davy Hill is close to the town and housing estate called Brades that is the location of the de facto temporary capital of Montserrat.

Davy Hill is connected by road with the settlement of St John's, which lies two kilometres to the southeast.

References

 Populated places in Montserrat